Jörg Peter (born 23 October 1955 in Dresden) is a former German long-distance runner. He held the German record over the marathon distance from 1988 till 2015.

Biography

Peter won bronze at the 3000 m run at the 1978 European Indoor Championships. In 1980 he competed for the DDR at the 1980 Olympic Games in Moscow in the men's 10,000-meter run and finished in 6th place.

In February 1988, he won the Tokyo International Men's Marathon with a 2:08:47, which remained the German Record until October 25, 2015, when Arne Gabius improved the time by 14 seconds. Peter started until 1990 for the SC unit Dresden.  He was East German champion in 5000-meter run in the years 1976, 1977, 1978 and 1980, in the 10,000-meter run in 1977 and in 1985 by his marathon victory at the Leipzig Marathon.

In 1990 and 1991 he won the Hamburg Marathon.

Achievements

References

External links

1955 births
Living people
German male long-distance runners
East German male marathon runners
Athletes (track and field) at the 1980 Summer Olympics
Athletes (track and field) at the 1988 Summer Olympics
Olympic athletes of East Germany
Athletes from Dresden
20th-century German people